Midland Airpark  is a public airport three miles north of Midland, in Midland County, Texas. The FAA's National Plan of Integrated Airport Systems for 2009–2013 categorized it as a general aviation facility.

Facilities
It has two asphalt runways: 7/25 is 5,022 by 75 feet (1,531 x 23 m) and 16/34 is 3,977 by 75 feet (1,212 x 23 m).

In the year ending August 13, 2008, the airport had 28,110 aircraft operations, average 77 per day: 93% general aviation, 7% air taxi, and <1% military. 90 aircraft were then based at this airport: 81.1% single-engine, 13.3% multi-engine, 2.2% jet and 3.3% helicopter.

References

External links 
 Midland Airpark (MDD) at Texas DOT Airport Directory
 Basin Aviation, the fixed-base operator (FBO)
 Aerial image as of January 1996 from USGS The National Map
 

Airports in Texas
Airports in Midland County, Texas